Our Lady of the Hills College Prep (OLH, OLH College Prep) is a private, Roman Catholic high school in Kerrville, Texas.  It is located in the Roman Catholic Archdiocese of San Antonio.

Background
In 1995, a consortium of individuals from a wide variety of backgrounds and interests connected, determined to provide families of the Texas Hill Country faith-based learning for their high school age boys and girls. The founders articulated a mission for the school to provide an exemplary education to students within a Christian community in order to educate young minds with a strong base of ethical and moral values.

Feasibility studies were conducted in local and surrounding communities from 1996 to 1997, and the results affirmed that interest and funding potential existed for the new school. The planning group sought guidance from the Roman Catholic Archdiocese of San Antonio. After receiving counsel from Archbishop Patrick Flores and with cooperation of the Fredericksburg Deanery, the Our Lady of the Hills College Prep project was incorporated as a 501(c)(3) organization in 1998 (under the original working name, “St. Ignatius Regional Catholic High School”).

Our Lady of the Hills humbly opened her doors in 2002 with just 19 students in portable classrooms. By 2007, the success of the students and the growth of the school sparked an insurgence of major local support which assisted in the construction of our now 54,000 square foot multi-use permanent campus on 80 acres of Texas Hill Country. Completed in 2009, the campus now sports 8 classrooms, 2 science labs, 2 fine art rooms, computer lab, library science center, chapel, full size competition gym, and administrative space.

Educational Philosophy 
The college preparatory curriculum and extra-curricular activities are rooted in the traditions of the Jesuit and Dominican orders and based on their philosophies of education and service to others. Our Lady of the Hills assists students in becoming mature in their faith and critical thinking. OLH challenges each student to develop his or her talents to the fullest and foster a lifelong commitment to support justice and service to others.

Ad Majorem Dei Gloriam  //  For the Greater Glory of God 
Jesuit education is a call to human excellence, to the fullest possible development of all human qualities. The well rounded and rigorous curriculum of Our Lady of the Hills is a call to critical and disciplined studies, a call to develop the whole person, head and heart, intellect and feelings all for the greater glory of God.

Veritas  //  Truth 
Dominican philosophy aims to achieve four main objectives: intellectual formation, world mission, social communication, and justice. As a Dominican inspired institution, Our Lady of the Hills prepares students to pursue truth- “Veritas”, to give compassionate service, and to participate in the creation of a more just and humane world. OLH is committed to independent thought and respect for divergent opinions.

Veritas Ad Majorem Dei Gloriam  //  Truth for the Greater Glory of God 
Combined, these two traditions make up the values-based, academically renowned curriculum at Our Lady of the Hills and provide the foundations for its objectives. OLH seeks to develop in the student both an attitude of openness to growth and an acceptance of personal responsibility; to prepare the student to be intellectually competent; to help students to become mature in their faith; to guide students to grow as loving people; and to foster in the student a commitment to support justice. Approximately sixty percent of the student body is Catholic.

Governance & Accreditation 
Our Lady of the Hills is an independently owned nonprofit organization under the governance of a board of directors. OLH works in collaboration with the Catholic Schools division of the Roman Catholic Archdiocese of San Antonio regarding its mission, guidelines, and accreditation.

Our Lady of the Hills is accredited by the following agencies:

 The Roman Catholic Archdiocese of San Antonio
 National Catholic Educational Association (NCEA)
 Texas Catholic Conference of Bishops Education Department (TCCB ED)
 Southern Association of Colleges and Schools (SACS)
 Council on Accreditation and School Improvement (CASI)
 AdvancED Improvement Network (AIN)

Notes and references

External links
 School Website
 How to Apply
 Donate 

Catholic secondary schools in Texas
Schools in Kerr County, Texas
Educational institutions established in 1998
1998 establishments in Texas